WLLS-LP was a low-power television station in Indiana, Pennsylvania, broadcasting locally on channels 49 and 65 as an affiliate of America One. The station was founded December 24, 1991 by Larry L. Schrecongost, who operated it until his death by heart attack in June 2010, when his widow, Nancy Schrencongost of Leland, North Carolina, assumed operations of the station. WLLS-LP was co-owned with radio stations WNCC and WRDD.

Originally classed as a low-powered repeater, WLLS-LP achieved Class-A status in early 2000, after the owner planned on including local and children's programming on its schedule. In February 2012, the station was warned by the FCC that they would be stripped of their Class-A status, after failing to file proper paperwork in relation to its children's programming since 2005.

On April 17, 2012, the FCC cancelled the license of WLLS-LP, after determining that the lack of submitted paperwork equated to the station having gone dark for at least 21 months, placing the approximate closure date in July 2010. Prior to the cancellation, Mrs. Schrencongost e-mailed the FCC, stating that the agency failed to act on her requests to transfer the station from his estate to her name, and the status of the license hampered efforts to sell the station. She also complained that Verizon Wireless had taken away the channel 65 signal for "emergency services", which she dismissed as "nonsense". She also complained that the reception of WLLS-LP from a former Adelphia headend in Indiana with a coat hanger was disallowed by the FCC as tangible proof for must carry protections, and that plans in 2006 to relocate the digital signal of WNPA (now WPCW) to channel 49 had also put the future of the station in doubt, an overture that Mrs. Schrencongost declared was "an illegal take-over". In closing to her letter, Mrs. Schrencongost said, "Please do not bother me again about silly FCC Forms. I don’t care what you do with WLLS-LP – which has been dark for 21 over months and is, consequently, a moot issue to begin with."

References

Television stations in Pittsburgh
Television channels and stations established in 1991
Television channels and stations disestablished in 2010
Defunct television stations in the United States
1991 establishments in Pennsylvania
LLS-LP
2010 disestablishments in Pennsylvania